The Cathedral of Sts. Peter and Paul is a Ukrainian Greek Catholic parish church in Chortkiv, Chortkiv urban hromada, Chortkiv Raion, Ternopil Oblast, Ukraine.

History 
The church was designed by the architect Sergey Gora. The cornerstone was laid and consecrated on March 19, 1992. The trident-shaped cathedral was inaugurated and consecrated on July 12, 2001.

Abbots 
 at. Andriy Lemchuk (abbot)
 at. Mykola Malyi (vice-pastor)
 at. Volodymyr Hrytsyv (employee)
 at. Roman Harasimov (employee)

References 

Churches in Chortkiv
Ukrainian Catholic churches